El Diario de Almería, founded as Almería Actualidad and sometimes called El Almería, is a Spanish newspaper edited in Almería. It was previously a free newspaper published between 2003 and 2009.

History 
It was launched on 1 November 2007 by Grupo Joly. According to Oficina de Justificación de la Difusión (OJD), in 2010 Diario de Almería had a spreading of 3.072 copies, while his web page had an average of 7.5297 visits.

References

Bibliography

External links 
 

Spanish-language newspapers
Publications established in 2007
Mass media in Almería
Newspapers published in Spain
2007 establishments in Spain